Nathaniel Smith (1762–1822) was a US Representative from Connecticut.

Nathaniel Smith may also refer to:
Nathaniel Smith (MP) (1730–1794), MP for Rochester and Pontefract
Nathaniel Smith (Tioga County, NY) in 55th New York State Legislature
Nathaniel Benedict Smith (1795–1881), Connecticut legislator, son of the US Representative
Nathaniel Cannon Smith (1866–1943), American painter and architect
Nathaniel Clark Smith (1877–1935), African-American musician, composer and music educator
Nathaniel Smith (Australian politician), member of the New South Wales Legislative Assembly

See also
Nathaniel Smith House, Union County, New Jersey, United States
Nathaniel Bowden-Smith (1838–1921), Royal Navy officer
Nathaniel Erskine-Smith (born 1984), politician in Ontario, Canada
Nathan Smith (disambiguation)
Nate Smith (disambiguation)